Chaudhary Sunder Singh is an Indian politician. He was elected to the Lok Sabha, the lower house of the Parliament of India from the Phillaur constituency of Punjab as a member of the Indian National Congress.

References

Indian National Congress politicians
Lok Sabha members from Punjab, India
India MPs 1980–1984
Possibly living people
Year of birth missing
Indian National Congress politicians from Punjab, India